The Sazak assault was an ambush carried out in 1997, in the Sazak neighbourhood of Reşadiye, in Turkey's Tokat Province. Four Turkish soldiers were killed in the ambush and although no group immediately claimed responsibility, the attack was later revealed to have been a joint operation by three Communist guerrilla groups: the Kurdistan Workers' Party and the Turkish Revolutionary People's Liberation Party–Front and Communist Party of Turkey/Marxist–Leninist.

The soldiers were returning to their outpost after a patrol and had only 1.3 kilometers left to travel when they were ambushed by a joint force of Kurdish PKK and Turkish DHKP/C and TKP-ML insurgents. Four soldiers were killed in the ambush and due to the heavy fog, all insurgents managed to escape.

That same year period the PKK and DHKP/C were also involved in a joint attack on a local flour factory in Tokat, which killed 3 Turkish officials. Twelve years later, a similar attack was carried out in the same area, which left 7 soldiers dead and 3 injured.

References

DHKP/C attacks

History of Tokat Province
Kurdistan Workers' Party attacks
Terrorist incidents in 1997
1997 in Turkey